ST4 or ST-4 may refer to:

 The Monospar ST-4, a variant of the Monospar aircraft, built by British aircraft manufacturer General Aircraft Limited.
 The Snow Trac ST4, a model in the Snow Trac family of Snowcat vehicles.
 The Ducati ST4s, a motorcycle manufactured by Ducati.
 Star Trek IV: The Voyage Home, a science fiction film in the Star Trek series.
 Starship Troopers: Invasion, fourth entry in the Starship Troopers film series.
 A popular Autoguider port in amateur astronomy

See also
 STIV (disambiguation)